State Road 849 (SR 849) is a  state highway from the Florida's Turnpike access road connecting Martin Luther King Boulevard/Hammondville Road and Coconut Creek Parkway (Broward County Route 912) to the north and Atlantic Boulevard (SR 814) to the south. State Road 849 lies entirely within the city limits of Pompano Beach, Florida.

Route description 
State Road 849 begins at an intersection with State Road 814 (Atlantic Boulevard) in Pompano Beach, Florida. The route progresses northward along Atlantic Boulevard Extension as a four-lane arterial boulevard. The road makes a curve to the northeast after passing over a bridge, but soon turns northward once again, passing a short stretch of commercial businesses. The highway then intersects with Dr. Martin Luther King Boulevard (County Road 912), where the designation terminates. The right-of-way for State Road 849 continues as the access ramp to the Florida's Turnpike (State Road 91) Exit 67.

History 

Although it passes through a residential development, SR 849 was originally built to be an access road between the Turnpike and Atlantic Boulevard, a major east–west highway that provides access to Pompano Park Race Track. About 1970, a section of SR 912 (which was originally on Hammondville Road between US 441-SR 7 and SR 811) was rerouted along the Atlantic Boulevard Extension and eastward along Atlantic Boulevard.  About 1983, as part of a statewide renumbering, Coconut Creek Parkway received an SR 912 designation and the Atlantic Boulevard Extension received SR 849 (afterwards SR 814 was - and is - entirely on Atlantic Boulevard).

Major intersections

References

External links 

Florida's Great Renumbering

849
849
State highways in the United States shorter than one mile
Pompano Beach, Florida